Lilia Silvi (22 December 1922 – 27 July 2013) was an Italian film actress. Silvi was one of several young actresses presented as an Italian equivalent to the Canadian-born Hollywood star Deanna Durbin. She appeared opposite Amedeo Nazzari, the most popular Italian star of the era, in five films.

Selected filmography

 Il signor Max (1937)
 Departure (1938)
 Unjustified Absence (1939)
 Then We'll Get a Divorce (1940)
 Big Shoes (1940)
 The Jester's Supper (1941)
 Scampolo (1941)
 Happy Days (1942)
 The Taming of the Shrew (1942)
 Lively Teresa (1943)
 Napoleon (1951)

References

Bibliography
 De Grazia, Victoria. How Fascism Ruled Women: Italy, 1922-1945. University of California Press, 1992.
 Gundle, Stephen. Mussolini's Dream Factory: Film Stardom in Fascist Italy. Berghahn Books, 2013.

External links

1922 births
2013 deaths
Italian film actresses
20th-century Italian actresses
Actresses from Rome